Invitation Only (絕命派對 or Jue ming pai dui) is a Taiwanese horror film directed by Kevin Ko and released in April 2009. The film was billed as "Taiwan's First-Ever Slasher Horror".

Plot
Wade Chen, who works for a rich and powerful CEO, Mr. Yang, accidentally sees his boss having sex with supermodel Dana. His boss supposedly rewards him by sending him to an exclusive party on company money. Wade's evening at the party includes receiving a new car, dancing, gambling and sex with the boss' mistress Dana. However, leaving the party is a problem and the guests are systematically hunted down and slaughtered by a masked slasher.

Cast

Production
Invitation Only marks the debut film for director Kevin Ko. A Love HK Film article describes the production as a "low-budget affair; the film was shot on high-def and the art direction is only a step up from 'converted warehouse'".

Release
The film was released theatrically in Taiwan on April 17, 2009, and in Hong Kong on June 18, 2009. Invitation Only was also released on DVD with English subtitles in 2009.

Reception
Invitation Only was received relatively poorly. Love HK Film wrote that it is "another film following in the footsteps of the "torture porn" vogue" and that it is an "entertaining if unremarkable thriller". China Post said it is for horror-fans only and that any "merit or message in “Invitation Only” is washed away in the crimson tide of bloodletting that it unleashes". Ho Yi at the Taipei Times was more positive, calling it a "90-minute ride of guilty thrills that combines graphic violence, repulsive torture and sexually suggestive imagery with bitter commentary on a wealth-obsessed society."

References

External links
 

2009 horror films
2009 films
2000s Mandarin-language films
Taiwanese slasher films
2000s English-language films